Nifa and Nishan Hindes (born 7 August 1979 in Gloucestershire, United Kingdom) are British identical twin models, born  to an English father and an Indian-Fijian mother.

They have been featured on the cover of Asian Women magazine, in Top Model magazine, in People magazine (including being listed on their "50 most beautiful people" in 1998), and in FHM as "100 Sexiest Women in the World" in 2003 as #92, and as Foster's Pitgirls, for Grand Prix motor racing.

They have had television appearances on shows such as Sex & Chocolate and The Young Person's Guide to Becoming a Rock Star, as well as in the television movie Homer's The Odyssey. They were also cast in a small roles in Star Wars: Episode I – The Phantom Menace, as the twin twi'lek slaves of the pod racer, Sebulba.

They are both 5' 11", with 34-25-35 measurements, and represented by Storm Models modelling agency.

References 
Fashion Model Directory: Hindes

External links 

1979 births
Living people
English female models
People from Gloucestershire
English people of Indo-Fijian descent
English Hindus
English twins